PS Palembang (English: Football Association of Palembang) is an Indonesian football club based in Palembang, South Sumatra. The team is also known as "Segentar Alam Warriors" and is owned by the Government of Palembang.

Logo
The circular logo suggests the unity of all communities in the city of Palembang.

Stadium
Gelora Sriwijaya Stadium also known as Jakabaring Stadium, is the current home of the PS Palembang and Sriwijaya FC.

Players

Current squad

Coaching Staff

Achievements & honours
Liga Indonesia Second Division
Champions (1): 1999
Liga 3 South Sumatra
Champions (1): 2021

References

Palembang
Football clubs in Indonesia
Football clubs in South Sumatra
Sport in South Sumatra
Association football clubs established in 1921
1921 establishments in the Dutch Empire